Obidim Peak is the rocky peak rising to 663 m in Erul Heights on Trinity Peninsula in Graham Land, Antarctica.  It is surmounting Cugnot Ice Piedmont to the northeast.

The peak is named after the settlement of Obidim in Southwestern Bulgaria.

Location
German-British mapping in 1996.

Maps
 Trinity Peninsula. Scale 1:250000 topographic map No. 5697. Institut für Angewandte Geodäsie and British Antarctic Survey, 1996.
 Antarctic Digital Database (ADD). Scale 1:250000 topographic map of Antarctica. Scientific Committee on Antarctic Research (SCAR). Since 1993, regularly updated.

Notes

References
 Obidim Peak. SCAR Composite Antarctic Gazetteer
 Bulgarian Antarctic Gazetteer. Antarctic Place-names Commission. (details in Bulgarian, basic data in English)

External links
 Obidim Peak. Copernix satellite image

Mountains of Trinity Peninsula
Bulgaria and the Antarctic